The trichloromethyl group is a functional group that has the formula –CCl3. The naming of is group is derived from the methyl group (which has the formula –CH3), by replacing each hydrogen atom by a chlorine atom. Compounds with this group are a subclass of the organochlorines. Some notable examples of compounds with this group are trichloromethane H–, 1,1,1-trichloroethane –, and chloral –.

The trichloromethyl group has a significant electronegativity.  For this reason, trichloromethyl-substituted acids, such as trichloromethanesulfonic acid, are often stronger than the original. For example, the acidity constant (pKa) of trichloroacetic acid – is 0.77, whereas that of acetic acid is 4.76.  

By the same principle, the trichloromethyl group generally lowers the basicity of organic compounds, e.g. trichloroethanol.

See also 
 Trifluoromethyl group
 Trichloromethoxy

References

Haloalkyl groups
 
Functional groups